Lines of baronets bearing the surname Stirling have existed since the 17th century in several distinct localities of Scotland. The earlier baronetages were created within the Baronetage of Nova Scotia (shown here as NS) and those after 1707 within that of Great Britain (GB).

Stirling baronets, of Ardoch (2 May 1651) NS

Sir Henry Stirling, 1st Baronet (died February 1669)
Sir William Stirling, 2nd Baronet (died February 1702)
Sir Henry Stirling, 3rd Baronet (18 November 1688 –   24 November 1753)
Sir William Stirling, 4th Baronet ( – 26 July 1799)
Sir Thomas Stirling, 5th Baronet (October 1733 – 8 May 1808)
Extinct on his death

Stirling baronets, of Glorat, Stirlingshire (30 April 1666) NS
Sir George Stirling, 1st Baronet (died )
Sir Mungo Stirling, 2nd Baronet (died 21 April 1712)
Sir James Stirling, 3rd Baronet (died 30 April 1771)
Sir Alexander Stirling, 4th Baronet (died 22 February 1791)
Sir John Stirling, 5th Baronet (died 16 March 1818)
Sir Samuel Stirling, 6th Baronet (28 July 1783 –  3 May 1858)
Sir Samuel Home Stirling, 7th Baronet (28 January 1830 –  19 September 1861)
Sir Charles Elphinstone Fleming Stirling, 8th Baronet (31 July 1831 –  September 1910)
Colonel Sir George Murray Home Stirling, 9th Baronet (4 September 1869 –  1 May 1949) Lord Lieutenant of Stirling 1936–1949
Dormant on his death - possible claimants in the United States. The probable succession is
Robert Wilson Stirling, possible 10th Baronet (1890 - 1970), a descendant of the 5th baronet
John Charles Stirling, possible 11th Baronet (1922 - 1982)
John Charles Stirling, possible 12th Baronet (b 1948)
Heir apparent is Jeffery Dundas Stirling (b 1969)

Stirling baronets, of Mansfield, Ayrshire (19 July 1792) GB
Sir James Stirling, 1st Baronet ( – 17 February 1805)
Sir Gilbert Stirling, 2nd Baronet ( – 13 February 1843)
Extinct on his death

Stirling baronets, of Faskine, Lanarkshire (15 December 1800) GB
Sir Walter Stirling, 1st Baronet (24 June 1758 –  25 August 1832) MP for Gatton, Surrey 1799–1802 and St. Ives 1807–1820
Sir Walter George Stirling, 2nd Baronet (15 March 1802 –  1 December 1888)
Sir Walter George Stirling, 3rd Baronet (5 September 1839 –  7 June 1934)
Extinct on his death

See also
Stirling-Hamilton baronets

References
William J. Booher, “Tracing Family Tree Turns into a Title Search: Greenwood man has some details to confirm before becoming baronet”, Indianapolis Star, 19 March 2009.  

Dormant baronetcies in the Baronetage of Nova Scotia
Extinct baronetcies in the Baronetage of Nova Scotia
Extinct baronetcies in the Baronetage of Great Britain
1651 establishments in Nova Scotia
1792 establishments in Great Britain